The Utica Road Covered Bridge is a Burr truss wooden covered bridge located near Lewistown, Maryland.  Originally built in 1834, it spanned the Monocacy River at the Devilbiss Bridge crossing.  An 1889 flood damaged the bridge and the surviving half was moved to Fishing Creek in 1891. Like the nearby Loys Station Covered Bridge, a pier was inserted at the middle of the bridge to halve its span.

The Utica Covered Bridge was listed on the National Register of Historic Places in 1978.

References

External links

, including photo in 1980, at Maryland Historical Trust

Covered bridges on the National Register of Historic Places in Maryland
Bridges in Frederick County, Maryland
Wooden bridges in Maryland
Road bridges in Maryland
National Register of Historic Places in Frederick County, Maryland
Burr Truss bridges in the United States